Gemini is the second album by American R&B singer El DeBarge. The album peaked at No. 35 on the Billboard Top R&B Albums charts.

Overview
The lead single, "Real Love", reached No. 8 on the Billboard Hot R&B Songs chart, as well No. 11 on the Billboard Dance Single Sales chart, and No. 14 on the Billboard Dance Music/Club Play Singles chart.  A second single, "Somebody Loves You", reached No. 24 on the Billboard Hot R&B Songs chart.

Track listing
"Real Love" (El DeBarge, Darryl DeBarge) - 4:08
"Cross My Heart" (E. De Barge, D. DeBarge) - 6:12
"Somebody Loves You"(E. DeBarge, D. BeDarge) - 5:06
"Broken Dreams" (E. DeBarge, D. DeBarge, Tony Radic) - 3:59
"Broken Dreams (reprise)" (E. DeBarge, D. DeBarge, Radic) - 1:52
"Turn The Page" (E. DeBarge, D. DeBarge) - 5:02
"After You" (Jay Graydon, Clif Magness, Glen Ballard) - 4:26
"Love Life" (Graydon, Gardner Cole) - 4:20
"Broken Dreams (Think About It)" (E. DeBarge, D. DeBarge, Radic) - 1:19
"Make You Mine" (E. DeBarge, D. DeBarge) - 4:24

Charts

References

1989 albums
Motown albums
El DeBarge albums